Earth 2150, also known as Earth 2150: Escape from the Blue Planet, is a real-time strategy game, originally published in 2000 by SSI and the Polish developer Reality Pump and a sequel to Earth 2140. 2150 was one of the first commercial full-3D games of its kind. A sequel to Earth 2150, Earth 2160, was published in August 2005. The game also has two stand-alone expansion packs: Earth 2150: The Moon Project, and Earth 2150: Lost Souls.

Story
It is the 22nd century, after years of war and famine of unfathomable level, the world is returning to normal. 12 states of the previous United States have joined to form the United Civilized States (UCS). While in Asia, a new empire was being created under the Iron Fist of the Khans, these Mongol descendants gave themselves a name meant to conjure up an association with a glorious former age: the Eurasian Dynasty (ED). The UCS now relied upon robots for all their needs, even their military is controlled by machines. GOLAN, the leader of the UCS military forces had recently been altered by order of the current President, leading to a number of glitches throughout the system. One of these caused it to underestimate the Eurasian Dynasty's defensive capacities, causing it to initiate the movement of a large force to occupy the British Isles. This mistake resulted in another violent war, lasting almost a decade. However, GOLAN managed to gain the upper hand against the battle-hardened Khans and so the ED resorted to the usage of advanced atomic weaponry. The ED attacked an encampment of UCS forces at the North Pole with a massive strike involving newly developed and untested atomic weaponry in an attempt to put a decisive end to the hostilities. The catastrophic resulting explosions pushed the Earth out of regular orbit and towards the Sun. Aware that the Earth's orbit has become unstable, a third faction living peacefully on the moon known as the Lunar Corporation (LC) joins the war in an attempt to defeat or reconcile both sides for the common good of humanity. The objective of the game is to collect enough resources to build an Evacuation Ship, allowing the player's people to journey to Mars and escape the looming apocalypse - foreshadowing Earth 2160.

Factions
Earth 2150 consists of 3 unique factions:

United Civilized States: This faction is a demarchy that controls North and South America. The name implies that the United States gradually expanded its borders to include all of the Americas. The United Civilized States (UCS) is a highly technologically based faction and have come to use robots to replace people in as many positions as possible.  The UCS scientists created, under the supervision of President Jonathan Swamp, NEO and GOLAN; a huge step in technological advances, GOLAN was essentially leader of the UCS military, while NEO was interested in politics. It was a machine capable of matching and potentially far surpassing any organic general. It controlled the entire UCS army including all the military robots. These bipedal robots, or mecha, are just as effective as a human-piloted vehicle. The UCS has a robotic theme to its structures and vehicles. They have exclusive access to powerful weapons such as grenade launchers, shadow generators, and plasma cannons. Other technologies include reverse-engineered anti-gravity propulsion systems from a crashed UFO, and modified 105 and 120mm cannons stolen from the ED. UCS vehicles include Tiger, Panther, Jaguar and Spider Mechs, Gargoyle, Bat and Dragon aircraft. UCS units are typically slow and expensive but durable and pack high firepower.

Eurasian Dynasty: Essentially a revitalized Mongol Empire based in Russia and Mongolia, the Eurasian Dynasty (ED) use primitive (by 22nd Century standards) technology such as tanks and helicopters. As such, the ED has the most basic methods of power generation and needlessly complicated resource-gathering. Basic ED units are armed with machine guns, 105 mm cannons, and rocket launchers, while more advanced vehicles can be equipped with laser & ion cannons (developed in response to the UCS' habit of AIs) as well as nuclear missiles. The ED has an industrial, Soviet-reminiscent theme to the design of its structures and vehicles. Some vehicles are the Pamir (reverse-engineered M1A2 Abrams tanks with a one-man crew), Kruszchev and Volga tanks, Ural "defense tanks" (actually, large, dual-hardpoint tanks), Cossack, Grozny, Thor and Khan helicopters, as well as the most powerful navy. ED units are typically individually weak but cheap and able to be produced in large numbers.

Lunar Corporation: The Lunar Corporation (LC) is a matriarchy faction of space colonists who colonized the Moon and cut themselves off from Earth soon after the 3rd World War. Normally a pacifist faction, the matriarchal LC are forced to head to Earth in order to secure minerals to build their Evacuation Ship (due to the Moon's general lack of accessible resources, in real life as well as in the game).  The Lunar Corporation is by far the most advanced of the three factions, utilizing solar power as well as antigravity vehicles (explained, in the game, as a result of researching extraterrestrial technologies). Because of this, they do not build trenches or dig tunnels like the UCS and ED. Also, instead of constructing buildings like the other two factions, the Lunar Corporation is able to transport them from orbit to the battlefield. In combat, they use exotic weapons such as electro-cannons and sonic weapons (originally a mining equipment). LC units are typically fast and technologically advanced, but fragile. In the single-player campaign, the forces of the LC are further bolstered by the solitary alien craft known as the Fang, a gift from the UCS in exchange for an alliance. Although losing this one-of-a-kind unit means instant failure, the Fang's weapon is capable of easily decimating any opponent it comes across—that is, until its ammo runs out.

Reception

In the German market, Earth 2150 debuted in 22nd place on Media Control's computer game sales rankings for November 1999. It took 25th and 23rd in the first and second halves of December, respectively, before dropping to 27th in January 2000 and 44th in February. The game's sales in the German region had surpassed 60,000 units by May, a performance that publisher Topware Interactive considered acceptable, according to PC Players Udo Hoffman. However, he noted that the game had been overshadowed by competitors Command & Conquer: Tiberian Sun and Age of Empires II: The Age of Kings, and remarked that "in retrospect, the date of publication was poorly chosen". David Fioretti of the German retailer PC Fun cited the game's numerous bugs and Topware's reputation as a "cheap brand" as further reasons for its failure to achieve hit status.

Earth 2150 was a commercial failure in the United States. CNET Gamecenter's Mark Asher reported in early September 2000 that the game had sold 23,163 units and earned revenues of $873,855 in the country. He felt that this performance "can't be classified as a hit", and with journalist Tom Chick explaining that it "didn't even hit PC Data's charts".

References

External links
Official site
InsideEarth - Earth 21xx Community

Earth 2150 review at IGN

2000 video games
MacOS games
Post-apocalyptic video games
Real-time strategy video games
Strategic Simulations games
Video games developed in Poland
Windows games
Video games set in the 22nd century
Video games set in Africa
Video games set in India
Video games set in Japan
Video games set in Australia
Video games set in the United States
Video games set in Russia
Video games set in Egypt
Video games set in Canada
Video games set in Madagascar
Video games set in Mozambique
Video games set in Brazil
Video games set in Peru
Video games set in the Democratic Republic of the Congo
TopWare Interactive games
Multiplayer and single-player video games
World War III video games